Chromodoris thompsoni is a species of very colourful sea slug, a dorid nudibranch, a marine gastropod mollusc in the family Chromodorididae.

Distribution
This species was described from Providential Hd, Wattamolla Bay, Royal National Park, Sydney. It has only been reported from New South Wales.

References

Chromodorididae
Molluscs of the Pacific Ocean
Endemic fauna of Australia
Gastropods described in 1983
Taxa named by William B. Rudman